Willem Gerhardus Engelbrecht (born 24 July 1992) is a South African rugby union player for the  in the Currie Cup and Rugby Challenge. His regular position is flanker.

Engelbrecht was included in the  squad as a loan player for the 2018 Super Rugby season. However he did not play any games that season before returning to the Pumas.

In 2021 he joined the Stormers on loan.  He played 5 games in the Pro14 Rainbow Cup and 5 games in the United Rugby Championship before returning to the Pumas for the 2022 Currie Cup season.

On 27 May 2022 it was announced that Engelbrecht and signed for the Stormers on a two year deal.

References

External links
itsrugby.co.uk profile

South African rugby union players
Living people
1992 births
Rugby union players from Pretoria
Rugby union flankers
Pumas (Currie Cup) players
Limpopo Blue Bulls players
Lions (United Rugby Championship) players
Stormers players
Western Province (rugby union) players